The Commonwealth Railways KA class was a class of  tender locomotives of the Commonwealth Railways, Australia. The class operated on the  Trans-Australian Railway.

History
Between September 1918 and June 1920, Commonwealth Railways took delivery of 26 KA class freight locomotives built to the same design as the New South Wales Government Railways' TF class (later the D53 class). Six were built by Perry Engineering, Gawler and 20 by Walkers Limited, Maryborough. They were an upgraded version of the K class.

The Perry built locomotives received superheaters in 1943. Three were converted to burn oil during the 1949 coal strike, but were converted back within months.

Most survived until replaced by GM class diesel locomotives with the last withdrawn in September 1952.

References

Notes

Bibliography

External links

KA class
Railway locomotives introduced in 1918
Walkers Limited locomotives
2-8-0 locomotives
Standard gauge locomotives of Australia
Scrapped locomotives
Freight locomotives